Lost in Transmission is an American reality television series produced by Adjacent Productions. The series features Top Gear co-host and car expert, Rutledge Wood and his friend, car restoration specialist George Flanigen, as they go on a road trip across the south. Their mission is to rescue America's greatest rides from barns, backyards and garages by restoring the under-appreciated and the most unusual automobiles to their former glory.

Premise
Opening introduction (narrated by Rutledge Wood):

Broadcast
The program premiered on Thursday, May 7, 2015, at 10:00 pm EST on History.

Internationally, the series premiered in Australia on September 7, 2015 on A&E.

Episodes

References

External links
 
 
 

2010s American reality television series
2015 American television series debuts
Automotive television series
English-language television shows
History (American TV channel) original programming
Television shows set in Georgia (U.S. state)
2015 American television series endings